Aha Naa Pellanta! is a 2011 Indian Telugu language  action comedy film written and directed by Veerabhadram. It stars Allari Naresh, the son of famous director E. V. V. Satyanarayana, and newcomer Ritu Barmecha. Srihari, Anita Hassanandani, Subbaraju, Samrat Reddy, and Brahmanandam play important roles. The music was composed by Raghu Kunche. The film was released on 2 March 2011.

The movie completed 50 days in 48 centers across the state and 100 days in all main centers. It was reported that this was the only Telugu film which raked profits in early 2011 along with Mirapakay and Ala Modalaindi.

Plot
Subrahmanyam is an intelligent, hardworking software engineer. He lives with his uncle, keeps a poster of Bill Gates in his room, spends most of his time with his girlfriend Madhu, and his friend Busy Balraj. After getting drunk heavily one night, he wakes up with another girl Sanjana. Neither he nor the girl remember how they got together, but they both start to believe that they had sex. Before long, Sanjana's goon brothers warn him of dire consequences if he doesn't marry their innocent sister. No matter how hard he tries to escape the marriage, he can't evade the brothers. Just when he has given up all hope and agrees to the forced marriage, he stumbles upon a secret that turns the tables, and finds himself in a drama of love and revenge.

Cast

Soundtrack

The music was composed by Raghu Kunche.

References

External links
 

2011 films
Films shot in Warangal
2010s Telugu-language films
Indian comedy-drama films
Films scored by Koti
2011 directorial debut films
Films scored by Raghu Kunche
2011 comedy-drama films